Kari Juhani "Gary" Sundgren (born 25 October 1967) is a Swedish former professional footballer who played as either a right back or a central defender. He played professionally with AIK and Zaragoza, in a 15-year career. A Swedish international for nearly a decade, he won a total of 30 caps and represented his country at UEFA Euro 2000.

Club career
Sundgren was born in Vammala, Finland, but moved to Sweden with his parents as a toddler, being raised in Västerås. There, he was often called Gary and it caught on, being addressed in the latter manner for the duration of his career.

Sundgren started playing professionally with AIK, being an undisputed starter from an early age. He scored the winner against Malmö FF when they became Swedish champions for the first time in 55 years, in 1992.

Subsequently, Sundgren moved abroad and joined La Liga club Real Zaragoza. He played 31 games in his first season, while also being instrumental in the Aragonese team's fourth place in 1999–2000.

After the 2001–02 campaign, with Zaragoza relegated, Sundgren returned to AIK, retiring from the game in 2006 after two seasons with two modest Stockholm sides, IFK Sollentuna and FC Djursholm.

International career
Sundgren represented Sweden at UEFA Euro 2000, and played in the 0–0 draw against Turkey in the tournament. He was capped 30 times, scoring once.

Personal life
Sundgren is the father of four children. One of his sons, Daniel, has also played for AIK, while his nephew Mikael Backlund spent several years with the Calgary Flames of the National Hockey League.

Career statistics

International 
International goals
Scores and results list Sweden's goal tally first.

Honours
AIK
Allsvenskan: 1992
Svenska Cupen: 1995–96, 1996–97

Zaragoza
Copa del Rey: 2000–01
Sweden

 King's Cup: 1997

References

External links

1967 births
Living people
People from Sastamala
Swedish people of Finnish descent
Sportspeople from Västerås
Swedish footballers
Association football defenders
Allsvenskan players
AIK Fotboll players
La Liga players
Real Zaragoza players
Sweden international footballers
UEFA Euro 2000 players
Swedish expatriate footballers
Expatriate footballers in Spain
Swedish expatriate sportspeople in Spain